Zheng Renhao (born June 1968) is a former Chinese politician who spent his entire career in south China's Guangdong province. He was investigated by China's top anti-graft agency in December 2022. Previously he served as deputy secretary-general of Guangdong Provincial People's Government.

He was a representative of the 19th National Congress of the Chinese Communist Party. He was a delegate to the 12th National People's Congress.

Early life and education
Zheng was born in Shantou, Guangdong, in June 1968, and graduated from Zhongnan University of Economics and Law in 1990. From 2004 to 2007 he did his postgraduate work at China University of Political Science and Law. He also studied at the California State University, Sun Yat-sen University and the Central Party School of the Chinese Communist Party as a part-time student.

Political career
Zheng joined the Chinese Communist Party (CCP) in December 1988.

Starting in July 1990, Zheng served in several posts in Guangdong Provincial People's Procuratorate, including recorder, secretary, assistant prosecutor, and deputy director. In August 2003, he became deputy head of the Department of Civil Affairs of Guangdong Province, and worked there for five years.

In July 2008, he became vice mayor of his home-city Shantou, rising to mayor in January 2012. 

In April 2016, he was named acting mayor of Zhuhai, confirmed in June of that same year.

He was party secretary of Zhanjiang in March 2017, in addition to serving as chairperson of Zhanjiang Municipal People's Congress since the following month. 

In May 2021, he was appointed director of the Guangdong Provincial Development and Reform Commission, but having held the position for only a year, when he was named deputy secretary-general of Guangdong Provincial People's Government.

Investigation
On 16 December 2022, he has been placed under investigation for "serious violations of laws and regulations" by the Central Commission for Discipline Inspection (CCDI), the party's internal disciplinary body, and the National Supervisory Commission, the highest anti-corruption agency of China.

References

1968 births
Living people
People from Shantou
Zhongnan University of Economics and Law alumni
China University of Political Science and Law alumni
Mayors of Zhuhai
Mayors of Shantou
People's Republic of China politicians from Guangdong
Chinese Communist Party politicians from Guangdong
Delegates to the 12th National People's Congress